Genesia Rosato (born 29 September 1957) is a retired British ballerina. She was a principal character artist with the Royal Ballet, Covent Garden, where her career lasted four decades from 1976 to 2016.

Early life
Genesia Rosato was born in Surrey. She joined the Royal Ballet School in 1972 at age 15.

Career
Genesia Rosato joined the Royal Ballet in 1976. In 1978, she created the role of Princess Louise in Kenneth MacMillan's ballet Mayerling. Her other appearances in recorded performances include fairy Candide and Carabosse in Sleeping Beauty, respectively in 1994 and 2006,  and the dancing mistress in The Nutcracker in 2015.

References

British ballerinas
Dancers of The Royal Ballet
Living people
People educated at the Royal Ballet School
1957 births